Forbes Charles Austin Pelton (March 19, 1920 – February 19, 2003) was a political figure in British Columbia. He represented Dewdney in the Legislative Assembly of British Columbia from 1983 to 1991 as a Social Credit member.

He was born in Vancouver, British Columbia, the son of Forbes Buel Pelton and Kathleen Francis Austin, and was educated in Burnaby and at Western University. In 1942, he married Louise Ratcliffe. Pelton was an alderman for Maple Ridge, also serving as mayor. He was a big
band singer and pianist in the late thirties.

From 1941 to 1970, he served in the Royal Canadian Air Force and Canadian Air Force and retired as a Wing Commander (Lieutenant Colonel). Pelton was a member of the provincial cabinet, holding the position of Minister of the Environment.

References 

1920 births
2003 deaths
British Columbia municipal councillors
British Columbia Social Credit Party MLAs
Canadian jazz pianists
Deaths from Parkinson's disease
Mayors of places in British Columbia
Members of the Executive Council of British Columbia
Musicians from Vancouver
Politicians from Vancouver
Royal Canadian Air Force officers
Royal Canadian Air Force personnel of World War II
20th-century Canadian politicians
20th-century Canadian pianists
Neurological disease deaths in British Columbia